MTK is the basketball branch of Hungarian sports club Magyar Testgyakorlók Köre.

Women's branch
MTK women's basketball team was founded is 1945, the other successor Vörös Meteor was founded in 1949, they merged in 1975 under the name MTK-VM. They dominated the Hungarian Championship through the 1960s with 9 titles between 1960 and 1970 (7 MTK and 2 Vörös Meteor). After the mergery they won two more championships in 1989 and 1991, appearing in the European Cup and the Ronchetti Cup. The team dissolved in 1997.

In 2013 the women's branch has been reinvented and they merged with the 21-times champion BSE under the name MTK-Budapest. In 2014–15 they finished at 10th (last) place, in 2015–16 they won the 2nd division, in 2016–17 they are playing in the top division again. In 2018–19 they finished at 12th (last) place, and they merged with TFSE, winner of the 2nd tier.

Men's branch
The men's team has no great history, they appeared in the first division in the 1950s, then they merged with Kistext. In 2011 MTK was re-founded and started a partnership with Elite Basket, they play in Törökbálint in the second division.

Titles
 Women
 Hungarian Championship (16)
 MTK: 1953, 1956, 1962, 1963, 1964, 1965, 1966, 1968, 1969, 1972
 Vörös Meteor: 1958, 1961, 1970
 MTK-VM: 1989, 1991
 Hungarian Cup (9)
 1955, 1962, 1963, 1964, 1965, 1967, 1968, 1969, 1972

References

External links
 mtkbasket.com

Women's basketball teams in Hungary
basketball
Sport in Budapest
Basketball teams established in 1945